The Atlanta Gay Men's Chorus (AGMC) is a nonprofit performing arts organization based in Atlanta, Georgia (USA).  The AGMC, along with the Atlanta Women's Chorus, are managed under their parent organization, Voices of Note.

With more than four decades of service, the AGMC remains committed to its mission – to inspire dialogue and drive social equity though  artistic excellence. Regardless of race, age, sexual orientation or  gender identity, the AGMC welcomes those dedicated to presenting  exceptional musical experiences for both its audiences and its members,  fostering inclusion and equality for all people. 

The AGMC's traditional concert season includes a Holiday Concert in early December at The Cathedral of St. Phillip in the Buckhead neighborhood of Atlanta, a Spring Concert in late April, and a Pride Concert in June. The AGMC is also a strong presence in the Atlanta LGBTQ Community due to their involvement in various charitable organizations, cultural events and the annual Atlanta Gay Pride Parade.

One of the world's longest-running gay choruses, the AGMC is a member of the international Gay and Lesbian Association of Choruses (GALA), and it actively participates in collaborative performances and educational efforts with GALA member choruses worldwide. The AGMC is also a member of Chorus America, an organization dedicated to the expansion of the choral movement in North America.

History
In August 1981, a time when the gay-rights movement was just gaining momentum, founding Artistic Director Jeffrey D. McIntyre and 45 singers came together to form something quite new, especially in the South — a singing group. Auditions were held on August 29th and the first rehearsal was held in September with a charter membership of 45 singers.  By the time the newly formed AGMC gave its premier performance at First Metropolitan Community Church on North Highland Avenue on October 18, membership had increased to 48.  More than 300 people attended.  Six weeks later, the AGMC presented its first Holiday Concert, Music of the Season, featuring ten decidedly Christmas songs, on November 29, 1981, at Grant Park United Methodist Church.

The AGMC was chartered in the U.S. state of Georgia as a domestic nonprofit organization on March 3, 1982, and was granted 501(c)(3) tax-exempt status by the Internal Revenue Service in December 1982.  The AGMC joined the Gay And Lesbian Association of Choruses (GALA Choruses), an international organization of gay, lesbian and mixed choruses, on September 2, 1984.  GALA has more than 185 member choruses with 10,000+ active members in 11 countries and hosts an international choral festival every four years (every three years in the 1980s).  The AGMC has attended and performed in every festival since 1989, including Seattle, Washington, in 1989; Denver, Colorado, in 1992; Tampa, Florida, in 1996; San Jose, California, in 2000; Montreal, Québec, in 2004, Miami, Florida, in 2008, and Denver, Colorado, in 2012 and 2016. AGMC is set to perform at GALA Festival 2024 in Minneapolis, Minnesota. 

In 1984, the AGMC was the first gay organization to have a float in WSB-TV's annual Independence Day Salute 2 America Parade, and was included again in 1985.  In 1994, the AGMC commissioned its first major work, Memento mori: an AIDS requiem by James Adler, which was world-premiered in 1996.  In 1997 and again in 1998, the AGMC presented concerts at the Fabulous Fox Theatre in Midtown Atlanta.

The AGMC has performed joint concerts with several other GALA choruses, including the New Orleans Gay Men's Chorus  in the late 1980s, One Voice of Charlotte, North Carolina in 1993, the Gateway Men's Chorus of St. Louis, Missouri in 1994, le Choeur International Gai de Paris (the International Gay Men's Chorus of Paris, France) in 1996, the Gay Men's Chorus of Washington, D.C. in 1999, Turtle Creek Chorale of Dallas, Texas in 2003, and several performances over the years with the Atlanta Feminist Women's Chorus (AFWC). On July 14th, 1986, the Atlanta Gay Men’s Chorus and the Atlanta Feminist Women’s Chorus joined more than 500 other choral group members for a performance in Woodruff Park in the middle of downtown Atlanta.

The AGMC has also performed joint concerts with several special guests, including the Derivative Duo (Seattle, Washington) in 1995, Dr. Maya Angelou in 1998, the Atlanta Ballet in 1999, Matt Alber in 2015, and Jessica Vosk in 2022.  For many years, the AGMC was a regular performer in the annual Heartstrings fundraiser for AIDS , St. Bartholomew's Episcopal Church's annual Olde English Festival and, from 1996 to 1998, was also a featured performer at First Night Atlanta.  The AGMC was the featured entertainment at the annual Southern Comfort Transgender Conference for many years.  In 2000, the AGMC presented a benefit concert for the Birmingham AIDS Network in Birmingham, Alabama.  In 2001, the AGMC, AFWC, and Atlanta Freedom Marching Band hosted a benefit concert for the victims and survivors of the September 11 terrorist attacks on America.  In 2002, the AGMC performed at the post-inaugural reception for City of Atlanta Mayor Shirley Franklin, the first time any LGBT organization had participated in such an event. The AGMC was invited to perform for the City of Atlanta Mayor's Inaugural Pride Reception, started by Mayor Keisha Lance Bottoms in 2018. Since then, the AGMC has been invited back to perform again at the 2nd Annual Pride Reception in 2019, and the 4th Annual Pride Reception in 2022, which was continued and hosted by the City of Atlanta Mayor, Andre Dickens.

In 2001, a quartet from the AGMC performed the national anthem at an Atlanta Braves home game, and in 2002, the entire chorus returned to do the same.  Mayor Shirley Franklin issued a proclamation declaring that day, June 5, 2002, as "Atlanta Gay Men's Chorus Day" in the City of Atlanta.  The AGMC is the only openly gay performing arts organization to perform the national anthem at an Atlanta Braves game. Now you can see the AGMC performing the National Anthem each year at the Atlanta Hawks games, including for their Atlanta Hawks Pride Night.

On December 20, 2013, the Atlanta Gay Men's Chorus became the first openly gay group to be invited to and perform at the Georgia State Capitol building. The performance was coordinated by Artistic Director Kevin Robison and Georgia State Rep. Karla Drenner. Ms. Drenner and other local dignitaries also attended the performance.

On March 12, 2014, the Georgia House of Representatives passed Resolution HR 1787 commending the Atlanta Gay Men's Chorus for its legacy and hard work. Representative Karla Drenner championed the Resolution through the House. The Resolution passed the House on the very day that the AGMC performed in the Rotunda of the Georgia State Capitol.

Artistic Directors

Current Artistic Director 

Donald Milton, III is the AGMC's current Artistic Director. He joined the Atlanta Gay Men’s Chorus in January 2018, bringing an impressive background in conducting, music education and music administration. Milton also serves as the full time Director of Music at the Unitarian Universalist Congregation of Atlanta (UUCA), the largest UU congregation in the Southeast. Active in the Atlanta music scene, he has served as the executive director of the Atlanta Master Chorale, artistic director of the DeKalb Choral Guild, founder and artistic director of Lux Atlanta, and founder of Sky Punch, a company that produces sing-alongs, concerts and other interactive community music events. 

Milton has extensive experience as an educator, including teaching general music at an alternative school for emotionally impaired youth. He is an active choral clinician, guest conductor, lecturer and performer. He studied at the University of Michigan School of Music, with concentrations in education, conducting and vocal pedagogy.

Previous Artistic Directors 
 Jeffrey D. McIntyre, Founding Artistic Director, 1981 - 1984 and 1991 - 1994, Interim Artistic Director, 2006-2007
 Neil Gregory, 1984 - 1987
 Richard D. Rechtin, 1988 - 1990
 David A. Puckett, 1995 - 1999 
 Gary W. Arnold, 1999 - 2000
 Leslie J. Blackwell, 2000 - 2006
 Kevin Robison, first Full-Time Artistic Director, 2007 - 2017

Discography
 The AGMC recorded three tracks for Gerald L. Stacy's CD, In Remembrance of Love, in 1997, including "Commencement" by Shelly Jackson, "Prayer for the Children" by Kurt Bestor, and "Irish Blessing," arranged by Robert Seeley.  "Prayer for the Children" was performed by the AGMC's small ensemble, Panache; David A. Puckett, Artistic Director.  Recorded and produced by Allgood Productions, Atlanta, Georgia.
 Carols, Revels and Holiday Cheer (1998)—a live recording of the AGMC's 1997 Holiday Concert at the Episcopal Cathedral of Saint Philip; David A. Puckett, Artistic Director.  Recorded and produced by DiverseCity Records, Austell, Georgia.
 Passions (2002)—a live recording of the AGMC's 2001 Spring Concert at St. Bartholomew's Episcopal Church; Leslie J. Blackwell, Artistic Director.  Recorded and produced by Gil Moor & Bill Brown, Atlanta, Georgia.
 A Real Family Holiday (2004)—a studio recording of music from the AGMC's 2003 Holiday Concert; Dr. Leslie J. Blackwell, Artistic Director.  Recorded by Allgood Productions, Atlanta, Georgia; produced by Dr. Leslie J. Blackwell.
 Live at the Cathedral (2004)—a live recording of the AGMC's 2004 Holiday Concert at The Episcopal Cathedral of Saint Philip; Dr. Leslie J. Blackwell, Artistic Director.  Recorded and produced by Allgood Productions, Atlanta, Georgia.
 And On Earth, Peace (2012)-a live recording of various selections from the AGMC's Holiday Concerts at the Cathedral of St. Phillip from 2008-2011. Kevin Robison, Artistic Director. Recorded by RM Audio, Atlanta, Georgia.

Performances 
1st Concert Season: 1981–1982

 The AGMC’s very first public performance, called simply "Sneak Preview", directed by Jeffrey D. McIntyre, was presented on October 18, 1981, at (First) Metropolitan Community Church in Virginia Highland.

 The 1981 Holiday Concert, "Music of the Season", directed by Jeffrey D. McIntyre, was presented on November 29, 1981, at Grant Park United Methodist Church.

 The 1982 Spring Concert, "Southern Knights", directed by Jeffrey D. McIntyre, was presented on May 15, 1982, at the Peachtree Playhouse.

2nd Concert Season: 1982–1983

 The 1982 Holiday Concert, "The Most Wonderful Time of the Year", directed by Jeffrey D. McIntyre, was presented on December 4, 1982, at All Saints’ Episcopal Church.

 The 1983 Pride Concert, "United in Song!", directed by Jeffrey D. McIntyre, was presented on June 18, 1983, at St. Luke’s Episcopal Church.

3rd Concert Season: 1983–1984

 The 1983 Holiday Concert, "Fanfare for Christmas", directed by Jeffrey D. McIntyre, was presented on December 10, 1983, at St. Luke’s Episcopal Church.

 The 1984 Pride Concert, "A Grand Night for Singing", directed by Jeffrey D. McIntyre and a joint performance with the Atlanta Feminist Women’s Chorus and the Atlanta Lambda Chorale, was presented on June 23 & 30, 1984, at the Dancers Collective.

 The AGMC, under the direction of Jeffrey D. McIntyre, performed in WSB-TV’s “Salute to America” parade in Atlanta on July 4, 1984, and was the first openly gay organization to do so.

4th Concert Season: 1984–1985

 The 1984 Holiday Concert, "Let Us Rejoice Together", directed by Neil Gregory, was presented on December 15, 1984, at St. Luke’s Episcopal Church.

 The 1985 Spring Concert, "Spring", directed by Neil Gregory, was presented on April 12 & 14, 1985, at the Walter C. Hill Auditorium of the High Museum of Art.

 The 1985 Pride Concert, "Way Down South of Broadway", directed by Neil Gregory, was presented on June 29, 1985, at the Academy Theater.

 The AGMC, under the direction of Neil Gregory, performed in WSB-TV’s “Salute to America” parade in Atlanta on July 4, 1985.

5th Concert Season: 1985–1986

 The 1985 Holiday Concert, "Celebrating the Season", directed by Neil Gregory, was presented on December 14, 1985, at St. Luke’s Episcopal Church.

 The 1986 Spring Concert, "Between the Devil and the Deep Blue Sea", directed by Neil Gregory, was presented on April 19, 1986, at the Richard H. Rich Theatre of the Woodruff Arts Center.

 The 1986 Pride Concert, "The Best of AGMC", directed by Neil Gregory, was presented on July 26, 1986, at the Academy Theater.

6th Concert Season: 1986–1987

 The 1986 Holiday Concert, "Throw Up the Sash", directed by Neil Gregory, was presented on December 13, 1986, at St. Luke’s Episcopal Church.

 The 1987 Spring Concert, "Red, White and Blues", directed by Neil Gregory, was presented on April 25, 1987, at the Walter C. Hill Auditorium of the High Museum of Art.

 The 1987 Pride Concert, "...When You’re Having Fun", directed by Neil Gregory, was presented on July 25, 1987, at the Walter C. Hill Auditorium of the High Museum of Art.

7th Concert Season: 1987–1988

 The 1987 Holiday Concert, "The Stockings Were Hung", directed by Neil Gregory, was presented on December 12, 1987, at St. Luke’s Episcopal Church.

 The AGMC, the Gay Men’s Chorus of South Florida and the Gay Men’s Chorus of Washington, D.C., presented "Brothers in Harmony", a joint performance under the direction Gary E. Keating, on February 20, 1988, at Victory Park Auditorium in North Miami Beach, Florida.

 The 1988 Pride Concert, "That’s Entertainment", directed by Richard D. Rechtin, was presented on July 30, 1988, at the Samuel Inman Middle School Auditorium.

8th Concert Season: 1988–1989

 The 1988 Holiday Concert, "A Special Holiday Concert", directed by Richard D. Rechtin, was presented on December 7, 1988, at Onstage Atlanta.

 The 1989 Spring Concert, "Heart Theme", directed by Richard D. Rechtin, was presented on February 18, 1989, at the Walter C. Hill Auditorium of the High Museum of Art.

 The 1989 Pride Concert, "Look to Your Dream", directed by Richard D. Rechtin, was presented on June 10, 1989, at the Walter C. Hill Auditorium of the High Museum of Art.

 The AGMC, under the direction of Richard D. Rechtin, performed at GALA Festival III at the University of Washington in Seattle, Washington, in July 1989.

9th Concert Season: 1989–1990

 The 1989 Holiday Concert, "A Gift of Song", directed by Richard D. Rechtin, was presented on December 2, 1989, at the June Cofer Auditorium at Southside High School.

 The AGMC, under the direction of Richard D. Rechtin, presented "The Gayest Event of the Season" on December 16, 1989, at the War Memorial Auditorium in Nashville, Tennessee.

 The 1990 Pride Concert, "In Harmony and Unity", directed by Richard D. Rechtin and a joint performance with the Atlanta Feminist Women’s Chorus, was presented on June 3, 1990, at the June Cofer Auditorium at Southside High School.

10th Concert Season: 1990–1991

 The 1990 Holiday Concert, "Carols, Toys & Sugarplum Fairies!", directed by Jeffrey D. McIntyre, was presented on December 8, 1990, at the June Cofer Auditorium at Southside High School.

 The 1991 Spring Concert, "Spring Break", directed by Richard Ezell, was presented on April 6, 1991, at the June Cofer Auditorium at Southside High School.

11th Concert Season: 1991–1992

 The 1991 Holiday Concert, "Men on Christmas", directed by Jeffrey D. McIntyre, was presented on December 15, 1991, at the 14th Street Playhouse.

 The 1992 Spring Concert, "WGAY Radio", directed by Jeffrey D. McIntyre, was presented on March 29, 1992, at the 14th Street Playhouse.

 The 1992 Pride Concert, "Tenth Anniversary Pride Concert", directed by Jeffrey D. McIntyre, was presented on June 14, 1992, at the Alliance Theatre of the Woodruff Arts Center.

 The AGMC, under the direction of Jeffrey D. McIntyre, performed at GALA Festival IV in Denver, Colorado, in the summer of 1992.

12th Concert Season: 1992–1993

 The 1992 Holiday Concert, "Home for the Holiday?", directed by Jeffrey D. McIntyre, was presented on December 19, 1992, at Henry Grady High School.

 The 1993 Spring Concert, "Homecoming Hop", directed by Jeffrey D. McIntyre, was presented on March 26, 1993, at Henry Grady High School.

 The 1993 Pride Concert, "Made in the USA: Homegrown Music", directed by Jeffrey D. McIntyre and a joint performance with One Voice from Charlotte, North Carolina, was presented on June 12, 1993, at Henry Grady High School.

13th Concert Season: 1993–1994

 The 1993 Holiday Concert, "Carols of Splendor", directed by Jeffrey D. McIntyre, was presented on December 17 & 18, 1993, at the William R. Cannon Chapel at Emory University.

 The 1994 Spring Concert, "An Evening with... Lenny, George, Steve & Fats", directed by Jeffrey D. McIntyre, was presented on March 25, 1994, at Henry Grady High School.

 The 1994 Pride Concert, "When We No Longer Touch", directed by Jeffrey D. McIntyre and a joint performance with the Gateway Men’s Chorus of St. Louis, Missouri, was presented on June 18, 1994, at the Robert Ferst Center for the Arts at Georgia Tech.

14th Concert Season: 1994–1995

 The 1994 Holiday Concert, "Christmas with Spirit", directed by Jeffrey D. McIntyre, was presented on December 16 & 17, 1994, at the William R. Cannon Chapel at Emory University.

 The 1995 Spring Concert, "Songs from the Heart", directed by Leslie J. Blackwell, was presented on April 8, 1995, at the Glenn Memorial Auditorium at Emory University.

 The 1995 Pride Concert, "WGAY Radio: Tune In Again!", directed by David A. Puckett, was presented on June 24, 1995, at the Robert Ferst Center for the Arts at Georgia Tech.

15th Concert Season: 1995–1996

 The 1995 Holiday Concert, "Masters in This Hall", directed by David A. Puckett, was presented on December 8 & 9, 1995, at St. Luke’s Episcopal Church.

 The 1996 Spring Concert, "Memento mori: an AIDS requiem", featuring the world premiere of the AGMC’s first major commissioned work by James Adler, directed by David A. Puckett, was presented on April 13 & 14, 1996, at Glenn Memorial Auditorium at Emory University.

 The 1996 Pride Concert, "The Atlanta Flames", directed by David A. Puckett and a joint performance with Le Choeur International Gai de Paris, France, was presented on June 29, 1996, at the Atlanta Civic Center.

 The AGMC, under the direction of David A. Puckett, performed at GALA Festival V in Tampa, Florida, in July 1996.

16th Concert Season: 1996–1997

 The 1996 Holiday Concert, "Fa La La La La...", directed by David A. Puckett, was presented on December 13 & 14, 1996, at the Episcopal Cathedral of Saint Philip.

 The 1997 Spring Concert, "United We Stand", directed by David A. Puckett and a joint performance with the Atlanta Feminist Women’s Chorus, was presented on April 11 & 12, 1997, at the Rialto Center for the Performing Arts.

 The AGMC, under the direction of David A. Puckett, recorded three songs in studio for Gerald L. Stacy’s CD, "In Remembrance of Love", in May 1997. The CD was released later that year.

 The 1997 Pride Concert, "Are We in Kansas Yet?", directed by David A. Puckett, was presented on June 28, 1997, at the Fabulous Fox Theatre.

17th Concert Season: 1997–1998

 The 1997 Holiday Concert, "Carols, Revels and Holiday Cheer", directed by David A. Puckett, was presented on December 11, 12 & 13, 1997, at the Episcopal Cathedral of Saint Philip. "Carols, Revels and Holiday Cheer" was subsequently released as the AGMC’s first commercially available CD.

 The 1998 Spring Concert, "Songs of Freedom and Celebration with Maya Angelou", directed by David A. Puckett, was presented on March 3 & 4, 1998, at the Fabulous Fox Theatre.

 The 1998 Pride Concert, "Decades of Divas", directed by David A. Puckett, was presented on June 27, 1998, at the Atlanta Civic Center.

18th Concert Season: 1998–1999

 The 1998 Holiday Concert, "Simply... Peace", directed by David A. Puckett, was presented on December 17, 18 & 19, 1998, at the Episcopal Cathedral of Saint Philip.

 The 1999 Spring Concert, "The Gay ’90s", directed by David A. Puckett, was presented on March 19 & 20, 1999, at the Rialto Center for the Performing Arts.

 The 1999 Pride Concert, "S’wellegant Elegance", directed by Gary W. Arnold and a joint performance with the Gay Men’s Chorus of Washington, D.C., was presented on June 19, 1999, at the Atlanta Symphony Hall at the Woodruff Arts Center.

19th Concert Season: 1999–2000

 The 1999 Holiday Concert, "A Family of Lights", directed by Gary W. Arnold, was presented on December 10 & 11, 1999, at the Episcopal Cathedral of Saint Philip.

 The 2000 Spring Concert, "Cameras, Postcards & Places to Be", directed by Gary W. Arnold, was presented on March 25, 2000, at the Robert Ferst Center for the Arts at Georgia Tech.

 The 2000 Pride Concert, "Celluloid, Footlights & Videotape", directed by Gary W. Arnold, was presented on June 17, 2000, at the Rialto Center for the Performing Arts.

 The AGMC, under the direction of Leslie J. Blackwell, performed at GALA Festival 2000 in San Jose, California, in July 2000.

20th Concert Season: 2000–2001

 The 2000 Holiday Concert, "Adeste Fideles", directed by Leslie J. Blackwell, was presented on December 8 & 9, 2000, at the Episcopal Cathedral of Saint Philip.

 The 2001 Spring Concert, "Passions", directed by Leslie J. Blackwell, was presented on March 31, 2001, at Saint Bartholomew’s Episcopal Church. "Passions" was subsequently released as the AGMC’s second commercially available CD.

 The 2001 Pride Concert, "Harmonic Convergence", directed by Leslie J. Blackwell and a joint performance with the Atlanta Feminist Women’s Chorus, was presented on June 23, 2001, at the Atlanta Symphony Hall at the Woodruff Arts Center.

 A quartet representing the AGMC, under the direction of Leslie J. Blackwell, performed the national anthem before an Atlanta Braves home game at Turner Field on August 8, 2001.

21st Concert Season: 2001–2002

 The 2001 Holiday Concert, "An Evening at St. Philip’s", directed by Leslie J. Blackwell, was presented on December 14 & 15, 2001, at the Episcopal Cathedral of Saint Philip.

 The AGMC, under the direction of Leslie J. Blackwell, performed at the post-inaugural reception for newly elected Atlanta Mayor Shirley Franklin at the Atlanta Civic Center on January 7, 2002.

 The 2002 Spring Concert, "Of Men & Music", directed by Leslie J. Blackwell, was presented on April 6, 2002, at Saint Bartholomew’s Episcopal Church.

 The AGMC, under the direction of Leslie J. Blackwell, performed the national anthem before a home game between the Atlanta Braves and the New York Mets at Turner Field on June 5, 2002.

 The 2002 Pride Concert, "WGAY Radio Theatre", directed by Leslie J. Blackwell, was presented on June 22, 2002, at Earthlink Live.

22nd Concert Season: 2002–2003

 The 2002 Holiday Concert, "Spirit of Lights", directed by Leslie J. Blackwell, was presented on December 12, 13 & 14, 2002, at the Episcopal Cathedral of Saint Philip.

 The AGMC, under the direction of Leslie J. Blackwell, presented "Brothers in Song", a joint performance with Turtle Creek Chorale, on January 25, 2003, at the Robert Ferst Center for the Arts at Georgia Tech.

 The 2003 Spring Concert, "Livin’ La Dulce Vita", directed by Leslie J. Blackwell, was presented on April 5, 2003, at the Robert Ferst Center for the Arts at Georgia Tech.

 The 2003 Pride Concert, "Babes in Boyland", directed by Leslie J. Blackwell, was presented on June 20 & 21, 2003, at the Robert Ferst Center for the Arts at Georgia Tech.

23rd Concert Season: 2003–2004

 The 2003 Holiday Concert, "A Real Family Holiday", directed by Leslie J. Blackwell, was presented on December 12 & 13, 2003, at the Episcopal Cathedral of Saint Philip. "A Real Family Holiday" was subsequently released as the AGMC’s third commercially available CD.

 The 2004 Spring Concert, "Spirited Away", directed by Leslie J. Blackwell, was presented on April 3, 2004, at the Robert Ferst Center for the Arts at Georgia Tech.

 The 2004 Pride Concert, "Reel Men", directed by Leslie J. Blackwell, was presented on June 18 & 19, 2004, at the Robert Ferst Center for the Arts at Georgia Tech.

 The AGMC, under the direction of Leslie J. Blackwell, performed at the 2004 GALA Festival in Montreal, Québec, in July 2004.

24th Concert Season: 2004–2005

 The 2004 Holiday Concert, "Home for the Holidays", directed by Leslie J. Blackwell, was presented on December 10 & 11, 2004, at the Episcopal Cathedral of Saint Philip.

 The 2005 Spring Concert, "One World", directed by Leslie J. Blackwell, was presented on April 2, 2005, at the Robert Ferst Center for the Arts at Georgia Tech.

 The 2005 Pride Concert, "Babes in Boyland 2", directed by Leslie J. Blackwell, was presented on June 17 & 18, 2005, at the Robert Ferst Center for the Arts at Georgia Tech.

25th Concert Season: 2005–2006

 The 2005 Holiday Concert, "Candlelight at the Cathedral", directed by Leslie J. Blackwell, was presented on December 9 & 10, 2005, at the Episcopal Cathedral of Saint Philip. "Candlelight at the Cathedral" was subsequently released as the AGMC’s fourth commercially available CD.

 The 2006 Spring Concert, "The Best of Times", directed by Leslie J. Blackwell, was presented on April 1, 2006, at the Robert Ferst Center for the Arts at Georgia Tech.

 The 2006 Pride Concert, "Beyond the Yellow Brick Road", directed by Jeffrey D. McIntyre, was presented on June 16 & 17, 2006, at the Robert Ferst Center for the Arts at Georgia Tech.

26th Concert Season: 2006–2007

 The 2006 Holiday Concert, "Wrapped in Light", directed by Jeffrey D. McIntyre, was presented on December 8 & 9, 2006, at the Episcopal Cathedral of Saint Philip.

 The 2007 Spring Concert, "Liberty: Songs of Protest and Awakening", directed by Jeffrey D. McIntyre, was presented on March 23 & 24, 2007, at St. Bartholomew's Episcopal Church.

 The 2007 Pride Concert, "Let's Misbehave!", directed by Robert Glor, was presented on June 16, 2007, at Presser Hall at Agnes Scott College.

27th Concert Season: 2007–2008

 The 2007 Holiday Concert, "Bells, Brass and Beyond", directed by Kevin Robison, was presented on December 7 & 8, 2007, at the Episcopal Cathedral of Saint Philip.

 The 2008 Spring Concert, "Divas & Dilemmas: Opera OUR Way", directed by Kevin Robison, was presented on March 29, 2008, at the Cobb Energy Performing Arts Centre.

 The 2008 Summer Concert, "They Had It Coming: The Music of Kander & Ebb", directed by Kevin Robison, was presented June 27 & 28, 2008, at the Alliance Theatre at the Woodruff Arts Center.

 Eighty members of the AGMC, under the direction of Kevin Robison, performed in the Knight Concert Hall in Miami, Florida, on July 15, 2008, during the weeklong GALA Choruses Festival 8.

28th Concert Season: 2008–2009

 The 2008 Holiday Concert, "Holiday Inn--and Out!", directed by Kevin Robison, presented on December 7, 2008, at the Bailey Performance Center at Kennesaw State University in Kennesaw, Georgia, and on December 12 & 13, 2008, at the Episcopal Cathedral of Saint Philip.

 The 2009 Spring Concert, "Shaken, Not Heard: Stories of Gay Men, Faith and Reconciliation", directed by Kevin Robison, presented in April 2009.

 The 2009 Summer Concert, "Lush Life: The Music of Billy Strayhorn", directed by Kevin Robison, presented in July 2009.

29th Concert Season: 2009-2010

 The 2009 Holiday Concert, "December Detours", directed by Kevin Robison, presented on December 11 & 12, 2009, at the Episcopal Cathedral of Saint Philip.
 The 2010 Spring Concert, "The Road Leads Back: Georgia on Our Minds" tour, directed by Kevin Robison, presented Spring of 2010. The tour went through Savanah, Georgia (March 20), Augusta, Georgia (March 21), Athens, Georgia (March 25) and ended in Atlanta, Georgia on March 26 & 27 at Virginia Highlands Baptist.
 The 2010 Summer Concert, "All You Need is Love: The Music of the Beatles", directed by Kevin Robison, presented on July 9 & 10, 2010, at the Rialto Center for the Arts.

30th Concert Season: 2010-2011

 The 2010 Holiday Concert, "Holiday Lights", directed by Kevin Robison, presented on December 10 & 11, 2010, at the Episcopal Cathedral of Saint Philip.
 The 2011 Spring Concert, "Divas 2: Opera Revisited", directed by Kevin Robison, presented on April 29 & 30, 2011, at the Conant Performing Arts Center at Oglethorpe University.
 The 2011 Summer Concert, "Thirty Years of Broadway", directed by Kevin Robison, presented on July 8 & 9, 2011, at the Rialto Center for the Arts.

31st Concert Season: 2011-2012

 The 2011 Holiday Concert, "Bells in Boyland" featuring the Atlanta Concert Ringers, directed by Kevin Robison, presented on December 9 & 10, 2011, at the Episcopal Cathedral of Saint Philip.
 The 2012 Spring Concert, "Gleeful Noise: Celebrating Glee Clubs Then & Now", directed by Kevin Robison, presented on March 30 & 31, 2012, at the Cannon Chapel at Emory University. 
 The 2012 Summer Concert, "Red, White & You: United We Stand", directed by Kevin Robison, presented on June 15 & 16, 2012, at the Glenn Memorial Auditorium at Emory University - Decatur. 
 GALA 2012 Choral Festival, directed by Kevin Robison, presented July 7-11, 2012, in Denver, Colorado. 

32nd Concert Season: 2012-2013

 The 2012 Holiday Concert, "And On Earth, Peace", directed by Kevin Robison, presented on December 7 & 8, 2012, at the Episcopal Cathedral of Saint Philip.
 The 2013 Spring Concert, "No Rest for the WICKED: The Music of Stephen Schwartz", directed by Kevin Robison, presented on April 19 & 20, 2013, at the 14th Street Playhouse. This concert also was the debut performance of the AGMC Women's Chorus Project.
 The 2013 Summer Concert, "Singing Out Proud" premiered "I am Harvey Milk" by Andrew Lippa, directed by Kevin Robison, presented on June 28 & 29, 2013, at the Glenn Memorial Auditorium at Emory University - Decatur. 

33rd Concert Season: 2013-2014

 The 2013 Holiday Concert, "Seasons of Family", directed by Kevin Robison, presented on December 6 & 7, 2013, at the Episcopal Cathedral of Saint Philip. Featuring the performance by the Atlanta Women's Chorus (formerly the AGMC Women's Chorus Project). 
 The 2014 Spring Concert, the premiere of "When I Was Your Age: Sons of Our Fathers", written and produced by the AGMC, directed by Kevin Robison, presented on March 27 - 30, 2014, at the Fabrefaction Theatre. 
 The 2014 Summer Concert, "CHER Determination", directed by Kevin Robison, presented on June 27 & 28, 2014, at the Rialto Center for the Arts. 

34th Concert Season: 2014-2015

 The 2014 Holiday Concert, "Tied up With Strings", directed by Kevin Robison, presented on December 5 & 6, 2014, at the Episcopal Cathedral of Saint Philip.
 The 2015 Spring Concert, "UnSUNG Heroes" featuring singer Matt Alber, directed by Kevin Robison, presented on March 27 & 28, 2015, at Druid Hills Methodist.
 The 2015 Summer Concert, "Men in the Mirror", directed by Kevin Robison, presented on June 26 & 27, 2015, at Druid Hills Presbyterian.

35th Concert Season: 2015-2016

 The 2015 Holiday Concert, "Deck the Halls", directed by Kevin Robison, presented on December 4 & 5, 2015, at the Episcopal Cathedral of Saint Philip.
 The 2016 Spring Concert, "And Justice for All" including a world premiere of "Libertad" by Kevin Robison, directed by Kevin Robison & Dr. Melissa Arasi, presented on March 18 & 19, 2016, at Peachtree Road United Methodist Church. This concert was presented by the Atlanta Gay Mens Chorus and the Atlanta Women's Chorus. 
 The 2016 Summer Concert, "The Story of Us" featuring the "When I Was Your Age" performance from 2014, directed by Kevin Robison, presented on June 24 & 25, 2016, at Druid Hills Presbyterian.
 GALA 2016 Choral Festival, "When I Was Your Age", directed by Kevin Robison, production by Christopher Repotski, presented on July 3, 2016, at the Ellie Caulkins Opera House in Denver, Colorado.

36th Concert Season: 2016-2017

 The 2016 Holiday Concert, "Comfort & Joy", directed by Kevin Robison, presented on December 2 & 3, 2016, at the Episcopal Cathedral of Saint Philip.
 The 2017 Spring Concert, Two Boys Kissing" from composer Joshua Shank, directed by Kevin Robison, presented on March 31 & April 1, 2017, at Druid Hills Presbyterian.
 The 2017 Summer Concert, "Revolution: The Music of the Beatles", directed by Kevin Robison, presented on June 30 & July 1, 2017, at the Rialto Center for the Arts.

37th Concert Season: 2017-2018

 The 2017 Holiday Concert, "Bells, Babs, & Beyond", directed by Kevin Robison, presented on December 8 & 9, 2017, at the Episcopal Cathedral of Saint Philip.
 The 2018 Spring Concert, "Midnight Train to Georgia", directed by Donald Milton III, presented on March 30 & 31, 2018, at Out Front Theatre.
 The 2018 Summer Concert, Broadway & Peachtree", directed by Donald Milton III, presented on June 29 & 30, 2018, at Out Front Theatre.

38th Concert Season: 2018-2019

 The 2018 Holiday Concert, "Holly, Jolly and Gay!", directed by Donald Milton III, presented on December 7 & 8, 2018, at the Episcopal Cathedral of Saint Philip.
 The 2019 Spring Concert, "Sound Off", directed by Donald Milton III, presented on April 5 & 7, 2019, at Atlanta City Hall.
 The Roger Smith Memorial Concert, AGMC performs their Stonewall Concert, directed by Donald Milton III, presented on June 15, 2019, at Trinity Presbyterian Church in Hendersonville, NC. This was part of Hendersonville's Pride Week.
 The 2019 Summer Concert, "I see You: 50 Years After Stonewall", directed by Donald Milton III, presented on June 22, 2019, at St. Luke's Episcopal Church.

39th Concert Season: 2019-2020

 The 2019 Holiday Concert, directed by Donald Milton III, presented on December 6 & 7, 2019, at the Episcopal Cathedral of Saint Philip.
 A special performance with Yacht Rock Schooner, "The Best Damn Queen Show Ever", presented on February 14, 2020, at the Variety Playhouse.
 The 2020 Spring Concert, "Queens & Queen", directed by Donald Milton III, presented on December 7, 2020, at Lassiter Concert Hall.
 The 2020 Summer Concert (Virtual Concert), "A Couch Cabaret", hosted by Donald Milton III, and the Atlanta Women's Chorus Artistic Director, Dr. Melissa Arasi, presented on May 21, 2020.

40th Concert Season: 2020-2021

 The 2020 Holiday Concert (Virtual Concert), "25 Years at the Cathedral", directed by Donald Milton III, presented on December 4 & 5, 2020, at the Episcopal Cathedral of Saint Philip.
 The 2021 Spring Concert (Virtual Concert), "Never Turning Back", directed by Donald Milton III and the Atlanta Women's Chorus Artistic Director, Dr. Melissa Arasi, presented on April 9 & 10, 2021. This was a combined concert with the Atlanta Women's Chorus.
 The 2021 Summer Concert, "Yaaaaaas Broadway" (Virtual Concert), directed by Donald Milton III, presented on June 18 & 19, 2021.

41st Concert Season: 2021-2022

 The 2021 Holiday Concert, "40th Anniversary Holiday Concert", directed by Donald Milton III, presented on December 3 & 4, 2021, at the Episcopal Cathedral of Saint Philip.
 The 2022 Spring Concert, "Rubyversary", directed by Donald Milton III, presented on April 10, 2022, at the Byers Theater. Hosted by Jorge Estevez with special guest, Broadway star Jessica Vosk. 
 The 2022 Fall Concert, the world premiere of Julian Hornik’s "QueerZ", directed by Donald Milton III, presented on October 15, 2022, at the Ferst Center for the Arts at Georgia Tech.

42nd Concert Season: 2022-2023

 The 2022 Holiday Concert, directed by Donald Milton III, presented on December 2 & 3, 2022, at the Episcopal Cathedral of Saint Philip.
 The 2023 Spring Concert, a commissioned piece of work titled "Songs of the Phoenix", directed by Donald Milton III, presented on March 25, 2023, at St. Luke's Episcopal Church.
 The 2023 Summer Concert, directed by Donald Milton III, is set to be presented on June 9-10, 2023. Located to be announced. 
 A small group from the AGMC is set to perform in Bologna, Italy for the Various Voices European Choir Festival, June 14-18, 2023, under the direction of Donald Milton III.

References

External links
Stuart A. Rose Manuscript, Archives, and Rare Books Library

Gay men's choruses
Organizations based in Atlanta
1981 establishments in Georgia (U.S. state)
Musical groups established in 1981
LGBT organizations in the United States
LGBT culture in Atlanta
Gay culture in Georgia (U.S. state)